Ash of Gods: Redemption is a dark fantasy tactical role-playing video game developed by AurumDust. Gameplay blends elements of the visual novel, roguelike, and computer card game elements. The game is written by Russian author Sergey Malitsky.

Gameplay
The story is presented in a form of a visual novel, with nonlinear plot development. The game's story is defined by the actions the player makes and the dialogue choices. The storytelling is built on the sequence of moral choices where each of the player's decisions significantly affects the further development of events. The crucial aspect here is the principle of "less evil": the player must constantly choose between the quick profit that may lead to unpleasant events in the future and the sacrifice that, in the opposite, will make easier the completing of one of the following episodes. Due to the game's roguelike influence, the story continues even after the protagonist's death.

The combat is turn-based in an isometric perspective. Battle skills not only use a character's energy but their health as well. Besides that, the player can use a pack of cards which are analogues of mighty spells. Formation of the pack, issuance of the cards during the battle and their usage are in many ways similar to classical collectible card games. Thus, the cards that player receives at the beginning of the battle are defining the player's strategy, while the characters that he has on the field are defining his tactics.

Plot
In a world named Terminus, based on High Medieval western Europe in terms of technology and moral development, the player takes control over several groups of characters, each headed by one of the major protagonists. There are three of them in the game: the retired captain of the royal guard Thorn Brenin, the wandering healer Hopper Rouley and the professional hitman Lo Pheng. These heroes find themselves at the threshold of events which are menacing to grow into the end of civilization.

Development
Official development of Ash of Gods: Redemption began in 2016, but according to AurumDust's CEO Nikolay Bondarenko (who previously worked in such companies as Streko-Graphics, TvxGames and GameNet), the concept of this game as one built on a ramified system of moral choices was developed by him several years earlier.

On May 23, 2017, AurumDust Studio launched a Kickstarter campaign for Ash of Gods: Redemption, which had a $75,000 goal. Chapters of novels by Sergey Malitsky, which were the literary basis of the game's script, are published on AurumDust's website. The game was released on March 23, 2018.

Soundtrack
The soundtrack for Ash of Gods: Redemption is created by composers Adam Skorupa (soundtracks for Max Payne 2, Painkiller, The Witcher and EVE Online), Krzysztof Wierzynkiewicz and Michał Cielecki.

Reception

The game received mixed to positive reviews from critics with most players praising the artstyle and animation but many players finding fault in the combat system for lacking strategic depth due to a clearly optimal playstyle. The storytelling  and choice-and-consequences system appealed to most, with some players citing inconsistency. "Ash of Gods swings back and forth between being immensely enjoyable and feeling like it could be doing things so much better" wrote Spencer Rutledge of HardcoreGamer.com.

Many critics noted Ash of Gods'numerous similarities to The Banner Saga, with reviewer Mick Fraser of GodIsAGeek.com going so far as to write "Ash of Gods is very much like The Banner Saga. And by “very much like”, I mean “almost exactly the same as.”

Notes

References

External links
 

2018 video games
Android (operating system) games
Digital collectible card games
Fantasy video games
IOS games
Linux games
MacOS games
Nintendo Switch games
PlayStation 4 games
Roguelike video games
Tactical role-playing video games
Turn-based tactics video games
Video games developed in Russia
Video games with isometric graphics
Windows games
Xbox One games
Buka Entertainment games
Multiplayer and single-player video games